is a Japanese fashion model, athlete and beauty pageant titleholder who won Miss Universe Japan 2008. she then represented Japan at Miss Universe 2008 in Vietnam and placed Top 15.

Biography
Mima currently attends Nihon University and her major is physical education. Mima suffers from a bone marrow disease which left the right side of her body incapacitated for three months when she was 13 years old, and a nerve disease called Guillain–Barré syndrome in junior high school. Since then Mima has returned to sports and competed seven times at the Japan National Track and Field Competition. She competes in the track and field team with a high jump of 1.65 m, approaching her own height of 1.73 m. Shortly after losing her grandmother, who died when she slipped on the bathroom floor, Mima lost her father in a car accident before winning Miss Universe Japan 2008.

Miss Universe Japan

Hiroko Mima, as a 21-year-old physical education student from Tokushima in Western Japan, was crowned Miss Universe Japan 2008 on April 3, beating out nine other finalists and a total of about 4000 entrants. Staged at the Tokyo International Forum, the final competition featured a "Fashion Island" performance. The nine other contestants who competed against Hiroko Mima were: Kana Anan, Sayo Yamaguchi, Yukari Honna, Moe Aoki, Yuri Horita, Rui Watanabe, Yoshimi Sato, Chie Hirai and Azusa Nishigaki.

Miss Universe 2008

She was the official representative for Japan at the Miss Universe 2008 pageant which took place in Nha Trang, Vietnam on July 14, 2008.

Miss Universe Japan National Director
Hiroko Mima is now the National Director of Miss Universe Japan as of 2018. Mima have previously trained Emiri Miyasaka for Miss Universe 2009.

References

External links
Official website 

1986 births
Living people
Miss Universe 2008 contestants
Japanese beauty pageant winners
People from Tokushima Prefecture
Nihon University alumni
Models from Tokushima Prefecture